Perfluorotriethylcarbinol is a perfluorinated alcohol. It is a powerful uncoupling agent and is toxic by inhalation.

See also
Perfluorinated compound
Uncoupling agent

References

Uncoupling agents
Perfluorinated alcohols
Tertiary alcohols